Sean Barnette (born June 25, 1986) is an American professional basketball player who plays for Fribourg Olympic Basket of the Swiss Basketball League. He spent the 2019–20 season with CSM Oradea of the Romanian Basketball League, averaging 10.1 points, 4.7 rebounds, and 1.6 assists per game before season was suspended. Barnette signed with Fribourg Olympic on July 12, 2020.

The Basketball Tournament

Beginning in 2015, Barnette has participated in The Basketball Tournament for team Primetime Players. The team won its first round match-up against Blue Zoo, a team of Middle Tennessee alumni in 2017, but lost in the second round to Ram Nation, a team of VCU alumni. In 2015 Barnette led the way as the PrimeTime Players cruised to a 94–66 upset over top-seeded TeamBDB in a game that ended early due to multiple ejections. Barnette led the team to the Super 17 Finals in Chicago before losing to Dirty South in the closing seconds.
The Basketball Tournament is an annual $2 million winner-take-all tournament broadcast on ESPN.

References

1986 births
Living people
American expatriate basketball people in Bulgaria
American expatriate basketball people in France
American expatriate basketball people in Lebanon
American expatriate basketball people in Romania
American expatriate basketball people in Switzerland
American men's basketball players
Basketball players from South Carolina
BC Rilski Sportist players
CS Universitatea Cluj-Napoca (men's basketball) players
CSM Oradea (basketball) players
Fort Wayne Mad Ants players
Iowa Energy players
Lille Métropole BC players
Lions de Genève players
Lugano Tigers players
People from Rock Hill, South Carolina
Saint-Vallier Basket Drôme players
Small forwards
Wingate Bulldogs men's basketball players